Jeremiah Moulton (b. York, Massachusetts (now in York, Maine), 1688, d. York, 20 July 1765) was a New England militia officer and member of the Massachusetts Council. As a boy, during King William's War, Moulton's parents were killed and he was taken captive in the Raid on York (1692).

He is buried in the Old York Cemetery,  York Village, York County, Maine, USA.

References 

 
 Moulton Biographical Sketch.1842.
 

People in Father Rale's War
Military history of Acadia
Military history of Nova Scotia
Military history of New England
Military history of Canada
History of Maine
Acadian history
1688 births
1765 deaths
People from York, Maine
Maine sheriffs
American militia officers